Umadevi (उमादेवी; c. 1150 – 1218) was one of the wives of King Veera Ballala II and a Mysore general during the Chalukya campaigns.

Born around 1150, Umadevi became one of the consort of Bellala II at age twenty-two. She commanded Mysore armies against the rival Chalukyas on at least two occasions, allowing Bellala to concentrate on administrative matters. Significantly contributing to the Hoysalas’ conquest of the Chalkyua at Kalyani (near present-day Bidar) in 1190, she eventually committed suicide, according to the Indian tradition of sati, following her husband’s death in 1218.

References

1150s births
1218 deaths
Women in 12th-century warfare
Indian women in war
People from Mysore
Military personnel from Karnataka
12th-century Indian women
12th-century Indian people
13th-century Indian women
13th-century Indian people
Women of the Kingdom of Mysore
People of the Kingdom of Mysore